The Simurq 2014–15 season is Simurq's ninth Azerbaijan Premier League season. They will compete in the 2014–15 Azerbaijan Premier League and the 2014–15 Azerbaijan Cup. Giorgi Chikhradze left his position as manager on 16 July 2014.

Squad

Transfers

Summer

In:

Out:

Winter

In:

Out:

Friendlies

Competitions

Azerbaijan Premier League

Results summary

Results

League table

Azerbaijan Cup

Squad statistics

Appearances and goals

|-
|colspan="14"|Players who away from the club on loan:
|-
|colspan="14"|Players who appeared for Simurq no longer at the club:

|}

Goal scorers

Disciplinary record

Notes
Qarabağ have played their home games at the Tofiq Bahramov Stadium since 1993 due to the ongoing situation in Quzanlı.
Araz-Naxçıvan were excluded from the Azerbaijan Premier League on 17 November 2014, with all their results being annulled.

References

External links 
 Simurq at Soccerway.com
 Official Website

Simurq PIK seasons
Simurq